My Choice (also known as Greatest Hits) is the first compilation album of South Korean boy band, Shinhwa. It was released on January 31, 2002 by SM Entertainment. The album features eleven previously released songs, from their debut album Resolver in 1998 to their fourth album Hey, Come On! in 2001, four new and one remix tracks. It was met with moderate success, selling 183,098 copies.

Tracks
New tracks in bold
 "My Life Style"
 "I Love You"
 "T.O.P (Twinkling of Paradise)"
 "Wild Eyes"
 "First Love"
 "All Your Dreams" (remix)
 "해결사" (The Solver)
 "Falling in Love"
 "Only One"
 "Yo!" (악동보고서)
 "천일유혼" (Sharing Forever)
 "으싸! 으싸!" (Uh Sha Uh Sha)
 "Wedding March" (너의 곁에서)
 "Hey, Come On!"
 "Maybe"
 "Into My Heart"

Chart performance

Release history

References

Shinhwa albums
2002 greatest hits albums